Stefania scalae is a species of frog in the family Hemiphractidae.
It is found in Guyana, Venezuela, and possibly Brazil.
Its natural habitats are subtropical or tropical moist montane forests, rivers, and rocky areas.

References

Stefania
Taxonomy articles created by Polbot
Amphibians described in 1970